Juhayna is one of the largest cities in Sohag Governorate, Egypt. It is characterized by extensive commercial activity. The population in 2020 was 273,582.

References

External links 

  Sohag on Wikivoyage
 Sohag on Travel grove
 Sohag photo album

 
Cities in Egypt
Former populated places in Egypt
Governorate capitals in Egypt
Populated places in Sohag Governorate
Metropolitan areas of Egypt
Medieval cities of Egypt